Govindaraja may refer to:

 Govindaraja I (r. c. 809-836 CE), Shakambhari Chahamana king of India
 Govindaraja II (r. c. 863-890 CE), Shakambhari Chahamana king of India
 Govindaraja III (r. c. 1012-1026 CE), Shakambhari Chahamana king of India
 Govindaraja IV (r. c. 1192 CE), Shakambhari Chahamana king of India

See also 
 Govindaraja Temple (disambiguation)
 Govindarajan (disambiguation)